New York's 43rd State Senate district is one of 63 districts in the New York State Senate. It has been represented by Republican Daphne Jordan since 2019, when she succeeded retiring fellow Republican Kathy Marchione.

Geography
District 43 covers some of the Hudson Valley and the eastern limits of the Capital District, including all of Columbia County, Rensselaer County, and parts of Saratoga County and Washington County; the largest municipality in the district is Saratoga Springs.

The district overlaps with New York's 20th, and 21st congressional districts, and with the 102nd, 106th, 107th, 108th, 112th, and 113th districts of the New York State Assembly.

Effective January 2023, the district will encompass all of Rensselaer County, most of Washington County, and the northeast corner of Albany County.

Recent election results

2020

2018

2016

2014

2012

Federal results in District 43

References

43